The Consolidated Appropriations Act, 2010 is the name of a United States appropriations bill created in the conference report for , originally the Transportation, and Housing and Urban Development Appropriations Act, 2010. The bill, signed into law on December 16, 2009, combined six of the seven fiscal year 2010 appropriations bills that were still pending before Congress near the end of 2009.

The six bills contained within the Consolidated Appropriations Act, 2010 are:

The defense appropriations dealt with separately soon after passage. The bill follows a similar bill from the previous year.

References

 

United States federal appropriations legislation
Acts of the 111th United States Congress